11:11 is the debut album by singer-songwriter Regina Spektor. Initially, it was self-released on CD and sold at Spektor's early shows. Stylistically, the album differs from Spektor's later work as she was heavily influenced by jazz and blues at the time of its recording.

In 2021, for the 20th anniversary of the album, Spektor announced a box set featuring a remastered version of 11:11 on clear vinyl and a 2-LP live album titled "Papa's Bootlegs", a compilation of Spektor's father's recordings of her early live performances. After releasing "Love Affair" to streaming services on 11:11's 21st anniversary, Spektor released the remastered version of the album to streaming services and began shipping the box set on August 26, 2022; the new digital release also included the "Papa's Bootlegs" live album as bonus tracks.

Reception

An Emeritus reviewer for Sputnikmusic awarded the album four stars. 

Reflecting on 11:11 for its 20th anniversary, Stereogums James Rettig dubbed it "an early example of… Spektor's immense talent and promise." 
Alongside 2002's Songs, Rettig credited it with solidifying her place in New York City's anti-folk scene.

Track listing
All tracks composed by Regina Spektor

Personnel
Regina Spektor – piano, vocals, percussion, guitar
Chris Kuffner - bass, percussion
Richie Castellano – bass, percussion, engineer, mixing
David Panarelli – art design, photography

See also
 11:11 (numerology)

References

External links
Regina Spektor – 11:11 Eleven Eleven Album
Review Summary

2001 debut albums
Regina Spektor albums
Self-released albums
Albums produced by Richie Castellano

ca:11:11